In mathematics, hypercomplex analysis is the basic extension of real analysis and complex analysis to the study of functions where the argument is a hypercomplex number. The first instance is functions of a quaternion variable, where the argument is a quaternion (in this case, the sub-field of hypercomplex analysis is called quaternionic analysis).  A second instance involves functions of a motor variable where arguments are split-complex numbers.

In mathematical physics, there are hypercomplex systems called Clifford algebras. The study of functions with arguments from a Clifford algebra is called Clifford analysis.

A matrix may be considered a hypercomplex number. For example, the study of functions of 2 × 2 real matrices shows that the topology of the space of hypercomplex numbers determines the function theory. Functions such as square root of a matrix, matrix exponential, and logarithm of a matrix are basic examples of hypercomplex analysis. 
The function theory of diagonalizable matrices is particularly transparent since they have eigendecompositions. Suppose  where the Ei are projections. Then for any polynomial ,  

The modern terminology for a "system of hypercomplex numbers" is an algebra over the real numbers, and the algebras used in applications are often Banach algebras since Cauchy sequences can be taken to be convergent. Then the function theory is enriched by sequences and series. In this context the extension of holomorphic functions of a complex variable is developed as the holomorphic functional calculus.  Hypercomplex analysis on Banach algebras is called functional analysis.

See also
 Giovanni Battista Rizza

References

Sources
 Daniel Alpay (ed.) (2006) Wavelets, Multiscale systems and Hypercomplex Analysis, Springer,  .
 Enrique Ramirez de Arellanon (1998) Operator theory for complex and hypercomplex analysis, American Mathematical Society (Conference proceedings from a meeting in Mexico City in December 1994).
 J. A. Emanuello (2015) Analysis  of functions of split-complex, multi-complex, and split-quaternionic variables and their associated conformal geometries, Ph.D. Thesis, Florida State University
 Sorin D. Gal (2004) Introduction to the Geometric Function theory of Hypercomplex variables, Nova Science Publishers, .
 R. Lavika & A.G. O’Farrell & I. Short (2007) "Reversible maps in the group of quaternionic Möbius transformations", Mathematical Proceedings of the Cambridge Philosophical Society 143:57–69.
 Irene Sabadini and Franciscus Sommen (eds.) (2011) Hypercomplex Analysis and Applications, Birkhauser Mathematics.
 Irene Sabadini & Michael V. Shapiro & F. Sommen (editors) (2009) Hypercomplex Analysis, Birkhauser .
 Sabadini, Sommen, Struppa (eds.) (2012) Advances in Hypercomplex Analysis, Springer.

Functions and mappings
Hypercomplex numbers
Mathematical analysis